Novo Zmirnovo is a village in the Bitola Municipality of North Macedonia. It used to be part of the former municipality of Kukurečani. Novo Zmirnovo distance is 10.12 km (6.29 mi) away from the center of the municipality.

Demographics
According to the 2002 census, the village had a total of 41 inhabitants. Ethnic groups in the village include:

Macedonians 41

References

External links
 Visit Macedonia

Villages in Bitola Municipality